Francesco Franchini (died 1559) was a Roman Catholic prelate who served as Bishop of Massa Marittima (1556–1559).

Biography
On 30 Oct 1556, Francesco Franchini was appointed during the papacy of Pope Paul IV as Bishop of Massa Marittima.
He served as Bishop of Massa Marittima until his death in 1559.

References

External links and additional sources
 (for Chronology of Bishops) 
 (for Chronology of Bishops) 

16th-century Italian Roman Catholic bishops
Bishops appointed by Pope Paul IV
1559 deaths